Gus Abelgas (born October 22, 1962) is a Filipino broadcast journalist known for his work in S.O.C.O. (Scene of the Crime Operatives).

Early life and education
Gus Abelgas was born to a poor family. His father who worked as driver and his mother who worked as a laundry worker. Their family lived as illegal settlers in San Andres, Manila during his youth. At a young age, Abelgas worked as a newspaper boy to help his family.

For his collegiate studies, he pursued a bachelor's degree in journalism at the Lyceum of the Philippines University in Manila. He also finished law studies but was not able to pass bar examination.

Career
Prior to joining ABS-CBN, Abelgas worked in the Department of National Defense as a writer for Juan Ponce Enrile and as a correspondent for People's Journal, a tabloid publisher before moving to television.

Abelgas joined ABS-CBN as early as 1987 as a member of the TV Patrol news team. He covered various natural disasters and events such as the 1991 eruption of Mount Pinatubo. Abelgas later shifted his focus to investigative journalism.

He covered crimes as an anchor in True Crime and Private I. In S.O.C.O. (Scene of the Crime Operatives) he worked with police and interviewed crime witnesses. He also communicates with convicted and suspected criminals as part of his work in S.O.C.O.. Of his own approach, Albegas said he talks with the suspect calmly. He has received death threats from people whom he helped imprison – this became frequent that Abelgas no longer finds it bothersome.

Abelgas also lent his voice in the 2018 fantasy comedy film Fantastica where he provided the voice of the Fairy Godmother, a live action role portrayed by Bela Padilla. For the role, he secured permission from the ABS-CBN News And Public Affairs.

Filmography

References

External links

Filipino reporters and correspondents
Filipino television journalists
Filipino male voice actors
1962 births
Living people
ABS-CBN News and Current Affairs people
Lyceum of the Philippines University alumni